Sankt Stefan ob Leoben is a municipality in the district of Leoben in the Austrian state of Styria.

Geography
Sankt Stefan lies in the Mur valley about 15 km west of Leoben in the geographical center of Styria.

References

Cities and towns in Leoben District